Robert Geoffrey Walker (29 September 1926 – 13 March 1997) was an English professional footballer who played as a left winger.

Career
Born in Bradford, Walker played for Bradford Park Avenue, Middlesbrough, Doncaster Rovers, Bradford City, Chelmsford City and Clacton Town.

References

1926 births
1997 deaths
English footballers
Bradford (Park Avenue) A.F.C. players
Middlesbrough F.C. players
Doncaster Rovers F.C. players
Bradford City A.F.C. players
Chelmsford City F.C. players
F.C. Clacton players
English Football League players
Association football midfielders
Association football wingers